The following lists events that happened during 2017 in Turkey.

Parliament
26th Parliament of Turkey

Incumbents
Recep Tayyip Erdoğan, President, 2014–current
Binali Yıldırım, Prime Minister, 2016–2018
İsmail Kahraman, Speaker of the Grand National Assembly, 2015–2018

Events

January
1 January – A terrorist attack on the Reina nightclub in Istanbul leaves 39 people dead.
2 January - The Islamic State of Iraq and the Levant claims responsibility for the attack on the nightclub yesterday.
3 January - The Grand National Assembly of Turkey votes to extend the state of emergency by 3 months after the attempted coup last year.
5 January – A car bomb explodes in İzmir perpetrated by TAK, killing 2 people.
13 January - President Erdogan vows that Turkish troops will remain in Cyprus in perpetuity and describes proposed terms of a rotating presidency to be unacceptable.
14 January - The Parliament of Turkey approves two constitutional amendments to expand the president's power to appoint new legislation and select the cabinet.
26 January - Greece refuses to extradite eight soldiers accused of playing a role in the coup attempt last year.
28 January - President Erdogan signs a 100 million pound deal with British Prime Minister Theresa May over the construction of fighter jets.
30 January - In the capital of Ankara, 269 people are put on trial after being charged for their roles in the coup attempt last year.
31 January – The Eurasia Tunnel, which combines the Asian and European continents with a black tunnel, has started uninterruptedly.

February
5 February - Over 800 suspected ISIL members are arrested by the Turkish police.
8 February - 4400 public servants are dismissed in another purge following the attempted coup last year.
9 February – A Russian airstrike accidentally killed 3 Turkish troops in al-Bab, Syria.
11 February - Abdulgadir Masharipov is charged with murder in relation to the night club shooting at the start of the year and remains incarcerated.
14 February - Over 800 people are detained by police due to allegations of them being members of the banned Kurdistan Workers' Party (PKK).
17 February – 2017 European Youth Olympic Winter Festival was held in Erzurum.
22 February - Turkey lifts the ban on female army soldiers wearing the hijab.
28 February - A trial of 330 suspects in last year's attempted coup opens as the largest trial to date.

March
4 March - A Syrian fighter jet crashed in the Hatay Province near the Syria–Turkey border.
11 March - Dutch authorities withdrew landing permissions for a Turkish minister following his support for the referendum in April. President Erdogan calls the Dutch authorities "Nazi remnants". In response, Dutch authorities expel another minister from Rotterdam to the border with Germany.
13 March - Dutch ambassador to Turkey, Cornelis Van Rij, was expelled from Ankara following a Dutch ban on Turkish ministers speaking at pro-Erdogan rallies.
29 March - Prime Minister Yildirim declares an end to Operation Euphrates Shield in Syria but says an operation will follow under a different name.

April
16 April – The 2017 Turkish constitutional referendum occurred.
17 April - President Erdoğan makes favorable statements on the reinstatement of capital punishment, announcing he would discuss the possibility with Devlet Bahçeli of the Nationalist Movement Party (MHP) and the then-Turkish prime minister Binali Yıldırım.
19 April – The 2017 Turkvision Song Contest was held in Ankara.
29 April - The 2017 block of Wikipedia in Turkey

May 
 19–21 May - 2017 EuroLeague Final Four

June 
 23 June - It is reported that the turkish education ministry announced the removal of evolution from the secondary school curriculum.

July 
 4 July - "Önce Vatan" Party was shut down by the Constitutional Court of Turkey.

September 
 22 September - Kadir Topbaş resigned from his position as the Mayor of Istanbul

October 
 10–15 October - 2017 Presidential Tour of Turkey

Deaths

 20 January – Vahit Melih Halefoğlu, diplomat and politician (born 1919)
 28 January – Engin Cezzar, director and actor (born 1935)
 30 March – Halit Akçatepe, actor (born 1938)
 1 May – Ahmet İsvan, politician and agronomist (born 1923)
 6 September – Şerif Mardin, social scientist (born 1927)

See also
List of Turkish films of 2017

References

 
Turkey
Turkey
Turkey
2010s in Turkey
Years of the 21st century in Turkey